Murex trapa, common name the rare-spined murex, is a species of sea snail, a marine gastropod mollusc of the family Muricidae, the rock snails.

Distribution
This species is widespread from Madagascar and Mascarene Islands, South-Eastern India, Sri Lanka and the Andaman Sea to southern Indonesia, Philippines, Taiwan and Southern Japan.

Habitat
Murex trapa can be found in demersal, sandy habitats.

Description

These moderately large shells are fusiforms or club-shaped, with height and acute spire and prominent spiral ridges. Shell surface is normally light brown or blue-gray with some yellowish-brown on spines. The body whorl shows three spiny varices. The aperture is lenticular, with a white interior margin and deep red-brown within. The outer apertural lip is crenulated. The sipholal canal is straight and moderately long (about 13–47 mm). Three to four short spines are restricted to the basal half of siphonal canal.

Biology
The rare-spined murex is an active  predator, mainly feeding  on  other molluscs  and barnacles.

References

External links

Bibliography
Cornelis Swennen, Robert Moolenbeek, N. Ruttanadakul - Molluscs of the Southern Gulf of Thailand
F. Pinn - Sea Snails of Pondicherry
G.E.Radwin - Murex Shells of the World: An Illustrated Guide to the Muricidae
Houart R. (2014). Living Muricidae of the world. Muricinae. Murex, Promurex, Haustellum, Bolinus, Vokesimurex and Siratus. Harxheim: ConchBooks. 197 pp.
Hsi-Jen Tao - Shells of Taiwan Illustrated in Colour
Ngoc-Thach Nguyên - Shells of Vietnam
R. Raviche lvan, T. Anandaraj and S. Ramu LENGTH –WEIGHT  RELATIONSHIP  of Murex  trapa and Meretrix meretrix FROM MUTHUPET  COASTAL  WATERS  IN TAMILNADU,  INDIA.
R. Tucker Abbot - Seashells of South East Asia
 Ng, T. (2015). Hong Kong Checklist of Marine Species.

Molluscs of the Indian Ocean
Molluscs of the Pacific Ocean
Gastropods described in 1798
Taxa named by Peter Friedrich Röding
Murex